Arthur Cecil Gardiner (December 26, 1899 – October 21, 1954) was a Major League Baseball pitcher who played in one game for the Philadelphia Phillies on September 25, .

On September 25, 1923, the Phillies were playing the Pittsburgh Pirates. Gardiner came into the game with two outs in the first inning, after starter Whitey Glazner allowed three hits and four earned runs. Gardiner faced two batters, and allowed one hit and one base on balls. He was then taken out of the game, and relieved by Jim Bishop. The Pirates won the game 18–5.

References

External links

1899 births
1954 deaths
Major League Baseball pitchers
Philadelphia Phillies players
Sportspeople from Brooklyn
Baseball players from New York City
People from Copiague, New York
Burials at Long Island National Cemetery
Newark Bears (IL) players